Away Bus is a Ghanaian film produced and directed by Kofi Asamoah of Kofas Media and Peter Sedufia of OldFilm Productions.

Synopsis
Two sisters try to raise money for their mother who is sick by becoming a bus driver with the help of their friend known to raise money to save their mum.

Cast
 John Dumelo
 Fella Makafui
 Clemento Suarez
 Salma Mumin
 Kalybos
 Ahoufe Patri
 Master Richard
 Umar Krupp
 Adjetey Anang
 Moesha Buduong
 Too Sweet Annan
 Yaw Dabo
 Akuapem Polo
 Abeiku Santana
 Kalsoume Sinare
 Big Akwes
 Akrobeto
 Roselyn Ngissah
 Agya koo
 Tracy Boakye

References

Ghanaian comedy films
2010s English-language films
English-language Ghanaian films